Bulge Lake is a 12-acre lake in Cook County, Minnesota which is tributary to the Poplar River. Bulge Lake reaches a maximum depth of 19 feet in a sudden depression just west of the mouth of the stream leading to Dogtrot Lake. Bulge lake is accessible through portages to Silver Lake and Dogtrot Lake. A fisheries survey turned up populations of walleye, northern pike, yellow perch, and white suckers.

References

Lakes of Cook County, Minnesota
Lakes of Minnesota
Superior National Forest